is a tram stop on the Tokyo Sakura Tram in Kita, Tokyo Japan.

Lines
Kajiwara Station is served by Tokyo Sakura Tram.

Railway stations in Japan opened in 1976
Railway stations in Tokyo
Tram transport in Japan